Simon Moulton Hamlin (August 10, 1866 – July 27, 1939) was a U.S. Representative from Maine for one term from 1935 to 1937.

Early life and career
Hamlin was born in Standish (Richville), Cumberland County, Maine, Hamlin attended the public schools, Gorham Normal School, and Bridgton Academy.

He taught school and, in 1900, graduated from Bowdoin College in Brunswick, Maine.
He served as superintendent of the South Portland and Cape Elizabeth schools from 1901–1925 and as city clerk of South Portland, Maine in 1913.
He engaged in the real estate business at South Portland in 1925.
He was also interested in farming.

He served as member of the board of registration 1926–1932. He served as mayor in 1933 and 1934.

Congress
Hamlin was elected as a Democrat to the Seventy-fourth Congress (January 3, 1935 - January 3, 1937). He served as chairman of the Committee on Memorials (Seventy-fourth Congress). He was an unsuccessful candidate for reelection in 1936 to the Seventy-fifth Congress.

Later career and death
He resumed the real estate business and farming in South Portland, Maine, until his death there July 27, 1939. He was interred in Hamlin Cemetery, Standish (Richville), Maine.

References

1866 births
1939 deaths
Bowdoin College alumni
American Christian universalists
19th-century Christian universalists
20th-century Christian universalists
People from Standish, Maine
University of Southern Maine alumni
Mayors of South Portland, Maine
Maine local politicians
Businesspeople from Maine
Democratic Party members of the United States House of Representatives from Maine
Bridgton Academy alumni